Yellowdine is a town located  east of Perth, Western Australia on the Great Eastern Highway. The townsite is in the Goldfields-Esperance region, situated in the Shire of Yilgarn.

History 
The town was initially planned in 1895 as a railway siding along the Coolgardie to Southern Cross railway line that was opened in 1896. Once gold was discovered at Mount Palmer close to Yellowdine in 1934 the government began to develop the siding as a town-site that was later gazetted in 1935.

The rest house at the railway station was partially destroyed by fire in 1947.

The name of the town is believed to be Aboriginal in origin, a misspelling of Yelladine, although its meaning is unknown.

References

Further reading 

 

Towns in Western Australia
Goldfields-Esperance
Shire of Yilgarn